Yunak is a town in Turkey.

Yunak may also refer to:
Yunak Gymnastic Society, a Bulgarian sports society
Yunak Stadium, a multi-use stadium in Sofia, Bulgaria
Yunak, Bulgaria, a village in Varna Province, Bulgaria
Yunak Peak, Antarctica

See also
Junak (disambiguation)